Michal Prášek is a Grand Prix motorcycle racer from Czech Republic. He currently competes aboard a BMW S1000RR in the Alpe Adria Road Race Superstock 1000 Championship. He is a two-time Alpe Adria Road Race Superstock 1000 Champion, winning it in 2015 and 2016.

Career statistics

By season

Races by year

Superbike World Championship

Races by year

(key) (Races in bold indicate pole position) (Races in italics indicate fastest lap)

* Season still in progress.

References

External links
 Profile on motogp.com

1988 births
Living people
Czech motorcycle racers
125cc World Championship riders
Sportspeople from Havlíčkův Brod